Leiocarpa is a genus of  plants in the family Asteraceae, native to Australia.

 Species

References

External links
  
  
 

Gnaphalieae
Asteraceae genera
Flora of Australia
Taxa named by Paul G. Wilson